The Ghoul is a 2016 British psychological crime thriller film written, directed  and co-produced by Gareth Tunley and starring Tom Meeten. The film was released on 14 October 2016 at the London Film Festival and received good reviews from critics.

Plot
A detective decides to go undercover to investigate a psychotherapist who, he thinks, is responsible for a murder.

Cast
Tom Meeten as Chris
Alice Lowe as Kathleen
Rufus Jones as Coulson
Niamh Cusack as Fisher
Geoffrey McGivern as Morland

Reception

Critical response
Stephen Dalton from The Hollywood Reporter gave it a good review, writing: "A British micro-budget nerve-jangler that keeps viewers guessing to the final frame, The Ghoul is a noir-flavored mood piece with grand ambitions beyond its minimal means". Peter Bradshaw writing for The Guardian gave the film 2 out of 5 stars, stating: "Initially interesting but heartsinkingly pointless, this brooding Brit indie takes us on a journey to nowhere". Catherine Bray from the Variety liked the film and said: "The Ghoul isn't the midnight horror romp its title may suggest and as such might disappoint a crowd with an appetite for shock and gore — it needs to be positioned subtly by distributors and festival programmers who may wish to lean more heavily on the apt Lynch comparisons from early reactions. Its twisty-turny psychological gymnastics should satisfy fans of oblique, Lost Highway-style material more than full-on horror-heads".

Accolades
The Ghoul was nominated for the 71st British Academy Film Awards in the category of Outstanding Debut by a British Writer, Director or Producer. However, it lost to I Am Not a Witch. The film was also nominated for a "Discovery Award" at the 2016 British Independent Film Awards, but lost to The Greasy Strangler.

References

External links

2016 thriller drama films
British thriller drama films
2016 drama films
2010s English-language films
2010s British films